Diploderma makii, also known as Ota's japalure, is a species of lizard native to Taiwan. The lizard is also closely related to Diploderma swinhonis.

References 

Diploderma
Reptiles of Taiwan
Reptiles described in 1989
Taxa named by Hidetoshi Ota